The Lake Van Ferry is a passenger ferry service operated by the Turkish State Railways. It runs  in Lake Van between Van and Tatvan. Ferry service began operations in 1971, when a railway from Van to Iran was built. The ferry carries mainly railcars across the lake along with passengers. Passengers of the weekly Trans-Asia Express used the ferry to bridge the gap between the two railways until the service was suspended in July 2015. 

As of November 2017, there are five operational ferries, two of which began service in 1971. Two new ferries, with greater capacity, have been ordered by the State Railways. One of the two are in service, while the second one is under construction in Tatvan.

The crossing takes about 4 and a half hours with the four older ferries and 3 and a half hours with the two new ferries.

References

Ferries of Turkey
Lake Van
Transport in Bitlis Province
Transport in Van Province